Dews is a surname, and may refer to:

Bobby Dews (1939-2015), American baseball player
George Dews (1921–2003), English cricketer and footballer 
Ian Dews (born 1964), English cricketer
John Dews (1945-1995), British motorcycle speedway rider
Peter Dews (born 1952), British philosopher
Peter Dews (director) (1929–1997), English stage director

See also
Dewes
DEWS, the Distant Early Warning System